Black to Gold is the debut studio album by Canadian electronic rock band Dear Rouge. It was released digitally on March 30, 2015, and physically on March 31, 2015. The singles from the album ("I Heard I Had", "Best Look Lately", "Black to Gold", and "Tongues") have all cracked the Top 15 on the Canadian Alternative Rock charts. The band released a sample of "Nostalgia" on March 4, 2015.

Track listing

Personnel 
 Danielle McTaggart – vocals, keys/synthesizers
 Drew McTaggart – vocals, guitar
 Ryan Worsley - various
 Maclean Carlson - drums
 Stefan Tavares - drums
 Brodie Tavares - bass

References

2015 debut albums
Dear Rouge albums